McGrath Estate Agents is an Australian residential real estate provider. Services include residential property sales, property management, mortgage broking, auctions and real estate training. McGrath Limited is a public company listed on the Australian Securities Exchange (ASX).

History
McGrath was founded in 1988 by John McGrath. In the mid-1980s John McGrath started his career at Goodhope Realty in Paddington, which became McGrath Goodhope in 1988.
On 7 December 2015 McGrath became a public company and was listed on the ASX. 
In 2022, McGrath had 108 offices with 73 in New South Wales, 18 in Queensland, 15 in Victoria, 1 in the Australian Capital Territory.[3][4] and 1 in Tasmania. Approximately  seven in every 10 offices were franchised and three in every 10 were company owned.

See also
John McGrath (entrepreneur)

References

External links
McGrath Website
YepHome Website

Housing in Australia
Real estate companies of Australia
Franchises
Companies listed on the Australian Securities Exchange